The Flemish name Balcaen originates from old French balcan : Studd (horse).

Spelling may vary to :
with -a-, -ae ou -aa-
with -c-, -k- ou -ck-
the sound a can change to become -u- ou -o-
with a genitive suffixe -s

Possible spelling :
Balcaen, Balcan, Balcans
Balkaen, Balkan
Baelcaen
Bolcaen
Bulckaen, Bulkaen, Bulckaan, Bulkaan

Patronym

Balcaen 
 Ronny Balcaen a Belgian political figure.

Balcan 
 George Balcan, a quebec member of the order of Canada.

Bulckaen 
The street name "Rue des frères Bulckaen" located in Comines, France (Nord-Pas-de-Calais) has its name originating from a succession of marshals-ferrand and cartwrights. Another origin would result from the death of three brothers named Bulckaen during the first world war.

Origin of the patronymic:
The name being of origin Flemish, a cut of the name can also look:
Bull - kaen: horn of bulls / or / strength of bulls

Other sources point out the origin as coming from the Dutch word pijp ( for tube, pipe ), giving the metronymic name for the music instrument player.

Madeleine Bulckaen, dean of the family,  achieved her 100th birthday in 2010.

Localisation 
Originated from Flemish Belgium, the name is now present through Dutchland, northern and eastern France, on the United States east coast, and in Canada Primarily in Saskatoon, Saskatchewan; also Calgary, Alberta & parts of Manitoba. 
(Also Quebec, but with alternate spellings.) The Saskatoon & Calgary Balcaens are directly descended from the Balcaen-Vandeput TransAtlantic Diamond Merchants (& Ocean Liner Fleets) of the late 18th & early 19th Centuries.

Surnames